Netblender US-based company that produces and develops software for creators of Blu-ray high definition media. Based in Alexandria, Virginia and founded in 2005 Netblender's primary product is the DoStudio line of Blu-ray authoring software. It is one of only three producers of professional Blu-ray authoring tools. Its software is aimed at both large budget studio productions and independent film makers.

Sony Creative Software purchased Netblender in October, 2011.

Products

Do Studio
Is one of only three professional Blu-ray encoding software products on the market today. Originally developed as a HD DVD only tool it was re released in 2008 for Blu-ray. It is a complete BD-ROM spec compliant tool with AACS support, BDCMF formatting, BD-J support. The tool includes a point and click graphical user interface.

BD Touch
BD Touch is software that allows iPhones and other wifi enabled hand held devices to connect to a Blu-ray player. This connectivity has several uses. It allows to device to act as a remote control or keyboard interface to enter data into the player. It also allows media transfer between the Blu-ray player and the device, so that video can be downloaded to an iPhone. There is also a possibility of leveraging the interactive features of the Blu-ray disc and interface of an iPhone to create games where the hand held device interacts with the Blu-ray disc. The first title to be released using BD Touch was the French version of Iron Man.

Netblender Live
Netblender live is the latest release from Netblender and was introduced at the NAB show of 2009. The program is a complete technology solution for connecting rich media content to a Blu-ray Disc via an internet connection. NetBlender Live helps with the production of online features such as updateable trailers, dynamic Picture in Picture, downloadable bonus footage.

Awards 
Netblender was nominated for the Outstanding Achievement in Advanced Media Technology for the Non-Synchronous Enhancement of Original Television Content Award of the 58th Annual Technology & Engineering Emmy Awards. It was nominated for its work on the PBS DVD, A Cultivated Life: Thomas Jefferson and Wine.

References 

Optical disc authoring
Optical disc authoring software
Blu-ray Disc
High-definition television
Java platform
Privately held companies based in Virginia